A Zeese (pl. Zeesen) is a traditional type of fishing gear used for bottom trawling in the shallow coastal waters (Bodden) of Pomerania. Depending on the type of the Zeese, it is drawn by one or two boats (Zees(en)boot or Tuckern, respectively).

Etymology

"Zeese" is one of the few words which remained in use after the medieval replacement of West Slavic dialects with Low German ones in northeastern Germany. According to Bielfeldt, it derives from Pomeranian seza, which in turn has its roots in Slavic *sěděti, meaning "sit."

Zeese nets

Historical Zeese trawls did not have wings, and all consisted of three consecutive compartments. From front to rear, these were termed Stolz, Mittelzeese or Hinternetz, and Stoß. Types of Zeese nets differed in size of these compartments, the size of the mouth, the size of the meshes, and whether a valve (Kohle) was integrated into the second compartment.

Zeese trawlers

Zeesenboot trawlers (Zeesenboote) are sailing boats which carry the Zeese on two ropes (Reepe) tied to stem and post stem or stem and Driftboom, a cantilever at the stern exceeding the length of the post stem. The Zeese is always on the luff side, since the trawler draws the net by drifting sidewards under full sail. The reddish color of most Zeesenboot sails derives from their traditional treatment with oak bark, to protect them against fungal infestation; to preserve their traditional look, this typical color is applied also to Zeesenboot sails made of modern materials.

Sources

References

Bibliography

Fishing techniques and methods